The Monastery of St. Bogorodica Prečista (Immaculate Mother of God) (Macedonian: Света Богородица Пречиста, Sveta Bogorodica Prečista) is a Macedonian Orthodox monastery situated near the city of Kicevo, North Macedonia. It is dedicated to the Virgin Mary, Mother of God.

In 1924 Dositej, later the first Archbishop of the Macedonian Orthodox Church, became a monk in this monastery. The monastery is also famous for the legend of the 'flying icon' that was moved three times to another monastery and, allegedly, miraculously returned by itself to the original place, guided by a ray of light. The feast of the monastery is Mala Bogorodica (birthday of Virgin Mary on September 21).

See also
Saint Evnuvios, Paisios and Averikios

External links 
Bogorodica Precista

Macedonian Orthodox monasteries
Eastern Orthodox monasteries in North Macedonia
Kičevo Municipality
Archbishopric of Ohrid